Andrew Roland White (born 3 July 1980) is a former Irish cricketer. He played in the 2007 Cricket World Cup in the West Indies, where Ireland reached the Super 8 stage. He is now a P.E. teacher in Grosvenor Grammar school. Andrew is currently the Free Kicks coach at Ards Football Club.

Playing career 
He was a right-handed batsman and a right-arm off-break bowler. He played for Northamptonshire, and with Ireland. He also lined up for the Irish Under-19s squad between 1999 and 2000.

White played in the ICC Trophy in 2001 and 2005 for Ireland, during the latter tournament, helping the Irish team to the final. Since 2006, he has played Twenty20 cricket with Northamptonshire.

White was selected in Ireland's 15-man squad for the 2011 World Cup.

On 10 February 2015, White announced his retirement from cricket at the age of 34. He played 232 times for Ireland between 2000 and 2014 where scored 4560 runs and taking 125 wickets.

Coaching career 
White was named as Specialist Coach of Ireland cricket team for the 2017 Desert T20 Challenge.

References

External links
 

1980 births
Irish cricketers
Ireland One Day International cricketers
Ireland Twenty20 International cricketers
People from Newtownards
Northamptonshire cricketers
Northern Knights cricketers
Living people
Cricketers at the 2007 Cricket World Cup
Cricketers at the 2011 Cricket World Cup
People educated at Regent House Grammar School
Alumni of Ulster University
Cricketers from Northern Ireland
Irish cricket coaches